is a Japanese motorcycle racer. He currently competes in the All Japan Road Race ST600 Championship aboard a Yamaha YZF-R6. He won the MFJ All Japan Road Race ST600 Championship in 2015 for the Yamaha Thailand Racing Team aboard a Yamaha YZF-R6. Yokoe has previously competed in the MFJ All Japan Road Race GP125 Championship, the MFJ All Japan Road Race GP250 Championship – where he finished as champion in 2006 – and the MFJ All Japan Road Race JSB1000 Championship.

Career statistics

Grand Prix motorcycle racing

By season

Races by year
(key)

References

External links

Japanese motorcycle racers
Living people
1978 births
250cc World Championship riders